Selsbakk Station is a railway station at Selsbakk in Trondheim, Norway on the Dovre Line. The station is located 6.4 kilometers south of Trondheim S and is served by local trains to Røros. The station was opened 1890 as part of Trondhjem–Støren Line, but moved somewhat in 1919 when it got a new station building when the line was converted to standard gauge and became part of the Dovre Line.

Railway stations in Trondheim
Railway stations on the Dovre Line
Railway stations opened in 1890
1890 establishments in Norway